Jeon Woo-chi was a taoist sorcerer during Joseon dynasty in Korea.

Jeon Woo-chi may refer to:

 Jeon Woo-chi: The Taoist Wizard, a 2009 South Korean film
 Jeon Woo-chi (TV series), a 2012 South Korean TV series